Euryops speciosissimus is a species of flowering shrub in the genus Euryops. It is endemic to the Fynbos region of South Africa. It is also known as the Clanwilliam daisy and giant resinbush; in Afrikaans it is called harpuisbos, meaning resin bush.

References 

speciosissimus